Governor Harriman may refer to:

W. Averell Harriman (1891–1986), 48th Governor of New York
Walter Harriman (governor) (1817–1884), 31st Governor of New Hampshire